Baba Jani-ye Abd ol Mohammad (also Romanized as Bābā Jānī-ye ‘Abd ol Moḩammad; also known as Bābā Jānī and Bābā Jānī-ye Abū Dajāneh) is a village in Ban Zardeh Rural District, in the Central District of Dalahu County, Kermanshah Province, Iran. At the 2006 census, its population was 624, in 144 families.

References 

Populated places in Dalahu County